Sangla Hill–Kundian Branch Line is one of several branch lines in Pakistan, operated and maintained by Pakistan Railways. The line begins from Sangla Hill Junction station and ends at Kundian Junction station. There are 22 railway stations from Sangla Hill Junction to Kundian Junction.

Stations

References

Railway stations on Sangla Hill–Kundian Branch Line
5 ft 6 in gauge railways in Pakistan